Ski Resort Tycoon is a business simulation game in which the player must successfully create and run a ski resort. The player is able to add a variety of structures including skilifts, lodges, bathrooms, warming huts and various accommodations. The goal is to become a 5 star resort. The game has a 3D mode where the player can view their resort. A Yeti can also be seen in the game, and it can be found eating the guests.

External links

2000 video games
Activision Blizzard franchises
Business simulation games
Windows games
Windows-only games
Skiing video games
Cat Daddy Games games
Single-player video games
Activision games
Video games developed in the United States